Robert Wade FRCS (1798–1872) was a British surgeon.

He was one of the original Fellows of the Royal College of Surgeons.

He is buried at Kensal Green Cemetery.

References

1798 births
1872 deaths
Burials at Kensal Green Cemetery
Fellows of the Royal College of Surgeons